Star Zulu is a Zambian boxer. He competed in the men's bantamweight event at the 1984 Summer Olympics.

References

Year of birth missing (living people)
Living people
Zambian male boxers
Olympic boxers of Zambia
Boxers at the 1984 Summer Olympics
Place of birth missing (living people)
Bantamweight boxers